Swan River is a provincial electoral division in the Canadian province of Manitoba.  It was created in 1903, in what was then the northwestern corner of the province.  Manitoba's borders expanded significantly in 1912, and Swan River is now located in the centre of the province, close to its western border with Saskatchewan.  The division has seen several redistributions.

The riding is bordered to the north by The Pas, to the south by Dauphin-Roblin, to the east by Lake Winnipeg and to the west by the province of Saskatchewan.  Lake Winnipegosis runs through the riding.

The community of Swan River is located in the riding's southwest corner.  Other communities in the riding include Birch River, Ethelbert, Minitonas, Camperville and Winnipegosis.

The riding's population in 1996 was 19,639.  In 1999, the average family income was $35,209, and the unemployment rate was 10.70%.  Twenty-eight per cent of the riding's residents are listed as low income, and over 25% of the population has less than a Grade Nine education (the third-highest rate in the province).

Thirty-six per cent of the riding's residents are aboriginal, and 10% are Ukrainian.  Agriculture accounts for 22% of Swan River's economy, followed by the health and service sector at 12%.

Swan River's political identity has undergone a significant change in recent years.  It was represented by the Progressive Conservative Party of Manitoba continuously for all but one term from 1932 to 1988, and was generally regarded as safe for the party during this period.  The current MLA is Rick Wowchuk, who was elected in 2016, returning the seat to the Tories for the first time since 1990.

List of provincial representatives

This riding has elected the following MLAs:

Electoral results

1903 general election

1907 general election

1910 general election

1914 general election

1915 general election

1920 general election

1922 general election

1927 general election

1932 general election

1936 general election

1941 general election

1945 general election

1949 general election

1953 general election

1958 general election

1959 general election

1962 general election

1966 general election

1969 general election

1973 general election

1977 general election

1981 general election

1986 general election

1988 general election

1990 general election

1995 general election

1999 general election

2003 general election

2007 general election

2011 general election

2016 general election

2019 general election

Previous boundaries

References

Swan River
1903 establishments in Manitoba